Koh-Lanta: Bocas del Toro was the third season of the French version of Survivor, Koh-lanta. This season took place in Panama on Bocas del Toro, and was broadcast on TF1 from June 6, 2003 to August 28, 2003 airing on Fridays at 6:55 p.m. The two original tribes this season were Boro and Machiga. Due to the high amount of evacuations and ejections that took place this season, two jokers (Hélène and Delphine) were added to the game midway through the competition and most of the original cast was eliminated before the merge. This season saw a first in the world history of Survivor when both finalists received three jury votes and were both given the titles of Survivor.

The winners of this season of Koh-Lanta were Delphine Bano and Isabelle Seguin who split the prize of €110,000.

Contestants

Future appearances
Moundir Zoughari and Antoine Sanchez returned for Koh-Lanta: Le Retour des Héros. Moussa Niangane returned for Koh-Lanta: La Revanche des Héros. Zoughari later returned for Koh-Lanta: La Nouvelle Édition. Niangane later returned for Koh-Lanta: L'Île des héros.

Challenges

Voting History

External links
(Official Site Archive)

03
2003 French television seasons
Television shows filmed in Panama